The women's slopestyle competition of the 2013 FIS Snowboarding World Championships was held in Stoneham-et-Tewkesbury, Québec, Canada on January 17 & 18, 2013. 37 athletes from 16 countries competed.

Medalists

Results

Qualification
The following are the results of the qualification.

Final

References

Slopestyle, women's